Parodia warasii is a cactus native to Brazil. Its small range is threatened by landslides.

References 

warasii
Cacti of South America
Endemic flora of Brazil
Endangered flora of South America